The Philipsburgh Building, also known as Philipsburgh Hall, is an architectural landmark building in Getty Square in downtown Yonkers, New York.  The grand, Beaux-Arts style structure was designed by G. Howard Chamberlin and built in 1904 using a unique all-concrete construction making it the first fireproof office building in Westchester County.  For years, the enormous grand ballroom within, with its 30-foot (9.1 m) ceilings and extensive gold leaf decor,  was a fixture of the social scene in Yonkers, playing host to all manner of meetings, parties and theatrical productions including speeches by Theodore and Franklin D. Roosevelt (resulting in its being named "The Roosevelt Ballroom" by Encore Caterers.

In the latter half of the 20th century, the building and the neighborhood around it fell into physical and economic disrepair.  By the 1980s, most of the building had been converted to low-rent apartments, while parts of it were left entirely unoccupied.  In the 1990s, the building benefited from a renewed interest in local development, and was heavily renovated and restored.  The grand "Roosevelt" ballroom once again found its place as a focal point of local culture.

The building was restored and renamed the Philipsburgh Performing Arts Center (PPAC, pronounced "P-pack" locally) in 2001. The PPAC concept was short-lived, however, and by early 2005 it had ceased to be.  The building's primary occupant is a South Asian restaurant called "Nawab" and its owners are also the caterers for events at the Ballroom.

It was listed on the National Register of Historic Places in 2001.

References

External links

Philipsburgh Hall case study at National Trust for Historic Preservation

Beaux-Arts architecture in New York (state)
Buildings and structures in Yonkers, New York
Commercial buildings completed in 1904
Commercial buildings on the National Register of Historic Places in New York (state)
National Register of Historic Places in Yonkers, New York